Siege of Avalon (SoA) is a fantasy action role-playing PC game developed by Digital Tome and published on July 19, 2000. The game follows the player's attempts to lift the siege of Avalon, a castle in the fictional land of Eurale. SoA was initially released in six separate installments, before being released in a combined "Anthology" edition.

History
Siege of Avalon was originally released as six individual "chapters." Each chapter expanded on the game's story, and included other new content. The game's first chapter was free for download, but the remaining five chapters had to be purchased. In 2001, Global Star Software released all six chapters of the game as "Siege of Avalon - Anthology". The anthology CD made minor changes to the game but was primarily identical to the downloadable chapters. The chapters are no longer available for download online.

There was initially a sequel to Siege of Avalon, titled Pillars of Avalon, planned, but Digital Tome went out of business prior to completing development of the second game.

In approximately 2003, Digital Tome granted permission for modification of the first chapter of Siege of Avalon. The intent was for the game to be developed to run on other platforms, have continued support available, and for the game to be distributed as open-source software under a Lesser General Public License (LGPL). As a result, the source code of the game was made available on Source Forge. In 2011 the project was moved to GitHub.

In 2014, Blackfly Studios announced that a digital re-release  of Siege of Avalon was planned, but the developer went out of business prior to any release.

In March 2016, a community developer from Germany started to work on the Delphi 4 source code from GitHub, but got many errors at first. So the work lasted until January 2017 when he finally fixed everything in order to play the game with that new application (Siege.exe).
In August 2017, he released a newer version including better resolution like HD (1280x720p) and Full-HD (1920x1080p).

In June 2019, another community developer tried to port the source code to a newer version of Delphi. Since January 2021 his released version works without any errors. Now his aim is to get rid of the DirectX stuff and .dll-files.

Meanwhile, in January 2020 the developer mentioned before enhanced his version in order to support some SoA-Mods. Since March 2021 there's also an English localization integrated.

In April 2021, an updated version of the game was released on Steam and GOG by SNEG (publisher).

Plot

Siege of Avalon takes place in the fictional land of Eurale. Within Eurale are seven kingdoms: Nisos, Aratoy, Oriam, Fornax, Elythria, Cathea, and Taberland. The seven kingdoms united to the citadel of Avalon as a central capital of the alliance. Within Eurale is a nomadic race called the Sha'ahoul. The Sha'ahoul, led by the leader Mithras, declared war on the seven kingdoms, ultimately besieging the city of Avalon.

The protagonist of the game is the playable character, which the user can customize and name. The protagonist arrives in Avalon by boat, several years into the siege. The protagonist's brother, Corvus, is already present within the castle when the player begins the game. The course of the gameplay follows the player through various quests related to maintaining Avalon's defenses and foiling plots to overtake the castle. The game climaxes in a battle between the player and Mithras, the leader of the Sha'ahoul, after the invading force breaks through the outer wall of Avalon.

Reception

References

External links
 
 Siege of Avalon Website on SourceForge.net
 Siege of Avalon: Open Source (Siege-of-Avalon-Open-Source on GitHub)
 Siege of Avalon Continued Development at Blackfly Studios

2000 video games
Action role-playing video games
Commercial video games with freely available source code
Episodic video games
Fantasy video games
Role-playing video games
Video games developed in the United States
Video games scored by Bjørn Lynne
Windows games
Windows-only games
Single-player video games
Global Star Software games
Take-Two Interactive games